Psikye (Psikya, Kapsiki) is an Afro-Asiatic language spoken in northern Cameroon and eastern Nigeria. Varieties include Psikyɛ and Zləngə. Blench (2006) classifies it as a dialect of Kamwe.

Names
In Cameroon, Psikya speakers use the name Margi to refer to their own language and its three varieties. The prefix ka-, in Kapsiki 'people', marks the plural ethnonym. It is called Higi in Nigeria.

Dialects
Psikyá covers the entire southwestern part of the arrondissement of Mokolo and Mogodé (department of Mayo-Tsanaga, Far North Region, Cameroon) along the Nigerian border, in the settlements of Roumzou, Mogode, and Roumsiki. The Sara people refer to them as Kamu.

Zléŋé and Wula are spoken in only two neighborhoods in the border village of Oula in Cameroon.

Writing system
A Psikyɛ spelling was developed by the Biblical Alliance of Cameroon and is used in the translation of the Bible into Psikyɛ, Ghena ta Shala, published in 1988. This uses several additional letters including in particular .

Notes 

 

Biu-Mandara languages
Languages of Cameroon
Languages of Nigeria